A project anatomy (also integration anatomy or organic integration plan) is a tool for integration planning that visualizes dependencies between work items in development projects. It is mainly used in incremental development and Integration Driven Development projects.

Overview 
The project anatomy has evolved from the system anatomy and in its purest form the work items (called work packages) reflect the development of system capabilities. Often a more pragmatic approach is taken, though, where work packages may contain other items with important dependencies as well, e.g. HW deliveries for embedded systems.

Benefits 
 Simple
 Easy to grasp view of what to do, what is done and the dependencies between work packages
 Collaborative
 Common view for developers, project managers and sponsors
 Helps in finding and managing risks and delays
 Can be used to manage dependencies between teams and sprints in large agile development projects

Limitations 
 Can include, but not manage, lead time aspects
 Can include, but not manage, resource aspects

History 
Project anatomies evolved from system anatomies at Ericsson since the late 1990s. Both the terminology and the methodology have differed between organizations and the difference between "system anatomy", "project anatomy", "delta anatomy" and "integration anatomy" is sometimes diffuse or non-existent. In 2004 FindOut Technologies presented a SW tool (Paipe) for managing anatomies with more properties. The company has, since then, worked to establish the term Project Anatomy.

Example 
The project anatomy below is an example showing the work packages needed to develop a simple issue management system. 

Work packages with many dependencies are called spiders and indicate a risk. The risk may be managed by splitting the work package or by moving dependants of it to later shipments (increments).

The colors indicate the current status of work packages, where green means "on track", yellow means "at risk" and red means "off track". Blue work packages are done.

Further reading 
 Taxén L et al., The System Anatomy: Enabling Agile Project Management,  Studentlitteratur, 
 Adler, N. (1999). Managing Complex Product Development – Three approaches. EFI, Stockholm School of Economics. 
 Berggren, C., Järkvik, J., & Söderlund, J. (2008). Lagomizing, organic integration, and systems emergency wards: Innovative practices in managing complex systems development projects. Project Management Journal, Supplement, 39, 111–122
 Lilliesköld, J., Taxén, L., Karlsson, M., & Klasson, M. (2005).  Managing complex development projects – using the system anatomy. In Proceedings Portland International Conference on Management of Technology and Engineering, PICMET '05, July 31 – Aug 4th, 2005, Portland, Oregon – USA.
 Taxén L, Lilliesköld J (2005)  Manifesting Shared Affordances in System Development – the System Anatomy, ALOIS*2005, The 3rd International Conference on Action in Language, Organisations and Information Systems, 15–16 March 2005, Limerick, Ireland, pp. 28–47. Retrieved from https://web.archive.org/web/20160303202022/http://www.alois2005.ul.ie/ (Feb 2006).
 Järkvik, J., Berggren, C., & Söderlund, J. (2007). Innovation in project management: A neo-realistic approach to time-critical complex systems development. IRNOP VIII Conference, Brighton, UK, September 19–21, 2007
 Jönsson, P. (2006).  The Anatomy-An Instrument for Managing Software Evolution and Evolvability. Second International IEEE Workshop on Software Evolvability (SE'06) (pp. 31–37). Philadelphia, Pennsylvania, USA. September 24,  2006.
 Taxén, L., & Lilliesköld, J. (2008). Images as action instruments in complex projects, International Journal of Project Management, 26(5), 527–536
 Taxén, L., & Petterson, U. (2010). Agile and Incremental Development of Large Systems. In The 7th European Systems Engineering Conference, EuSEC 2010. Stockholm, Sweden, May 23–26, 2010
 Söderlund, J. (2002). Managing complex development projects: arenas, knowledge processes and time.  R&D Management, 32(5), 419–430.

Project management techniques
Product development
Systems engineering